Wayne Ferreira and Stefan Kruger were the defending champions, but Ferreira did not participate this year.  Kruger partnered Cyril Suk, losingin the first round.

Goran Ivanišević and Marc Rosset won the title, defeating Mark Kratzmann and Jason Stoltenberg 7–6, 7–6 in the final.

Seeds

  Luke Jensen /  Laurie Warder (first round)
  Sergio Casal /  Javier Sánchez (semifinals)
  Stefan Edberg /  John Fitzgerald (quarterfinals)
  Stefan Kruger /  Cyril Suk (first round)

Draw

Draw

References
Draw

Next Generation Adelaide International
1992 ATP Tour
1992 in Australian tennis